The fourth series of The Bill, a British television drama, consisted of forty-eight episodes, broadcast between 19 July – 29 December 1988. This series was the first to adopt a half-hour format, and the theme tune had its first of several updates. The making of every episode broadcast in 1988 is covered in the guidebook Witness Statements: Making The Bill (1988), featuring in-depth interviews with 60 cast and crew, production notes, locations, viewing figures and rare behind-the-scenes photographs.

The series was first released on DVD on 4 December 2006 in Australia, incorrectly packaged as Seasons 4 & 5, when in fact the set only contained the entire series four. The series was later issued in four separate volumes in the United Kingdom, available on 30 June 2008, 2 March 2009, 11 May 2009 and 15 March 2010. It was later reissued in Australia on 31 August 2011. The above DVD artwork is taken from the most recent Australian release. It features an image of DS Ted Roach. The British volume artwork features a variety of collage images featuring characters from across the season. The original Australian box set features a sole image of DI Frank Burnside.

Cast changes

Arrivals
 Insp. Christine Frazer
 SRO Marion Layland
 DI Frank Burnside (as regular)
 PC Malcolm Haynes
 Ch. Insp. Derek Conway
 PC Pete Ramsey
 WPC Claire Brind
 WPC Suzanne Ford
 DC Tosh Lines

Departures
 None

Episodes

References

1988 British television seasons
The Bill series